The 7 municipalities of the Kymenlaakso Region in Finland are divided on two sub-regions.



Kotka-Hamina Sub-region 
 Hamina (Fredrikshamn)
 Kotka
 Miehikkälä
 Pyhtää (Pyttis)
 Virolahti (Vederlax)

Kouvola Sub-region 
 Kouvola

Former municipalities 

 Haapasaari (to Kotka in 1974)
 Anjala (formed Anjalankoski with Sippola in 1975)
 Sippola (formed Anjalankoski with Anjala in 1975)
 Karhula (to Kotka in 1977)
 Kymi (to Kotka in 1977)
 Vehkalahti (to Hamina in 2003)
 Anjalankoski (to Kouvola in 2009)
 Elimäki (to Kouvola in 2009)
 Jaala (to Kouvola in 2009)
 Kuusankoski (to Kouvola in 2009)
 Valkeala (to Kouvola in 2009)
 Iitti was transferred to Päijänne Tavastia in 2021, remaining independent.

See also 
Southern Finland
Regions of Southern Finland

External links 

 
Municipalities of Finland